The 1st Independent Mixed Brigade or 1st Mixed Brigade (獨立混成第1旅團) was an experimental combined arms formation of the Imperial Japanese Army. In July 1937, at the beginning of the Second Sino-Japanese War, the brigade was known as the Sakai Brigade, for its commander, Lt. General Koji Sakai. The brigade participated in Battle of Taiyuan in late 1937. After being promoted lieutenant general Masaomi Yasuoka took command from 1938 to 1939.

The tank component, all but the 4th Tank Battalion, was pulled from the brigade in 1938. Major General Suzuki Teiji assumed command in 1941. By 1944 defense of the Japanese homeland prompted the creation of the inner line of defense extending northward from the Carolines, the Marianas, and the Ogasawara Islands. The brigade was assigned to the 31st Army under General Hideyoshi Obata. There the 1st Mixed Brigade and the 2nd Mixed Brigade became part of the 109th Division, commanded by General Tadamichi Kuribayashi. The 1st Mixed Brigade was stationed on Chichi-jima with the division headquarters and the 2nd Brigade was moved to Iwo jima overseen by Kuribayashi.

The brigade consisted of the following units:
 1st Independent Infantry Regiment
 4th Tank Battalion
 12 Type 89 Medium Tanks
 13 Type 95 Light Tanks
 12 Type 94 Tankettes
 4 Armored Engineer Vehicles
 1st Independent Artillery Battalion
 1st Independent Engineer Company

See also 
Independent Mixed Brigades (Imperial Japanese Army)

References 

Independent Mixed Brigades (Imperial Japanese Army)
Military units and formations established in 1937
Military units and formations disestablished in 1944
1937 establishments in Japan
1944 disestablishments in Japan